The third VA-95 established April 1, 1972 and reclaiming the original "Green Lizards" name, the first VA-95 being established in 1943, as an Attack Squadron of the U.S. Navy. The second squadron was established on 1 April 1950, renamed the "Skyknights",.  The unit returned to the name "Green Lizards" and was disestablished on 31 October 1995.

History

1970s 
In April 1973, the squadron provided support for Operation End Sweep, the clearing of mine fields along the coast of North Vietnam.

Aircraft from VA-95 would participate in Operation Frequent Wind, the evacuation of American personnel from Saigon. The squadron provided armed escort flights over the Saigon area for protection of the helicopters conducting the evacuation.

On 15 May 1975, The squadron participated in the recovery of the American merchant ship SS Mayaguez following its capture by Cambodian gunboats. The squadron flew sorties in support of the Marine landings on Koh Tang Island and retaliatory strikes against Cambodian targets. Squadron aircraft struck the airfield and naval facility at Ream, Cambodia. The squadron's KA-6D aircraft were used to provide tanker support for the combat sorties.

1980s 
Squadron aircraft attacked Iranian Boghammar speedboats, using Rockeye cluster bombs. They sunk one and damaged another. 

The aircraft evaded the missiles and returned fire with two AGM-84 Harpoons and four laser-guided Skipper bombs. This attack was followed by a Harpoon firing from Joseph Strauss. The attack against the Sahand left her blazing. Eventually the fires reached her magazines, and the final explosions lead to her sinking. 

Following this action the sister ship of the Sahand, the Sabalan, left port and engaged several of the squadron’s aircraft, firing a missile at them. One of the squadron’s A-6s responded with a laser-guided bomb that hit Sabalan, and she went dead in the water. The Sabalan was taken in tow by an Iranian tug, her fantail partially submerged. VA-95’s aircraft were ordered not to continue the attack. The squadron continued to fly combat sorties during 19 April but no other action resulted.

 1990s 
In October–November 1990, during the s cruise from the East to West Coast via Cape Horn, the squadron participated in joint exercises with the Argentinean, Chilean, and Ecuadorian Armed Forces. During their 1993 with the Lincoln, the squadron participated in Operation Southern Watch in Iraq and Continue Hope in Somalia.

Home port assignments
The squadron was assigned NAS Whidbey Island.

Aircraft assignment
The squadron first received the following aircraft on the dates shown:
 A-6A Intruder – 1972
 A-6B Intruder – 1972
 KA-6D Intruder – 1972
 A-6E Intruder – 4 February 1976
 A-6E SWIP Intruder  –'' 1993

See also
 VA-95 (U.S. Navy)
 Second VA-95 (U.S. Navy)
 Attack aircraft
 List of inactive United States Navy aircraft squadrons
 History of the United States Navy

References

Attack squadrons of the United States Navy
Wikipedia articles incorporating text from the Dictionary of American Naval Aviation Squadrons
Military units and formations disestablished in 1995